Cephalouterina is a genus of trematodes within the family Lecithodendriidae under the order Plagiorchiida. Individuals of this genus are known to use amphibian hosts.

Species
Species within the genus Cephalouterina include:
 Cephalouterina decamptodoni

Ecology
Cephalouterina decamptodoni has been isolated within the amphibian host rough-skinned newt in British Columbia.

Line notes

References
 C. Michael Hogan (2008) Rough-skinned Newt (Taricha granulosa), Globaltwitcher, ed. Nicklas Stromberg [https://web.archive.org/web/20090527153302/http://www.globaltwitcher.com/artspec_information.asp?thingid=43182
 ITIS Report: Genus Cephalouterina (2008) 
 Zipcode Zoo (2008) Genus "Cephalouterina" 

Plagiorchiida genera